The Social Affairs Committee is one of the eight standing committees of the French National Assembly.

Chairwomen 
15th legislature of the French Fifth Republic

 Brigitte Bourguignon (2018 to 2020)
 Fadila Khattabi (since 2020)

References 

Committees of the National Assembly (France)
Society of France